Casteldidone is a comune (municipality) in the Province of Cremona in the Italian region Lombardy, located about  southeast of Milan and about  east of Cremona.

Casteldidone borders the following municipalities: Casalmaggiore, Martignana di Po, Piadena, Rivarolo del Re ed Uniti, Rivarolo Mantovano, San Giovanni in Croce.

References

External links
 Official website

Cities and towns in Lombardy